Herman Austin "Ham Hands" Harrison (September 29, 1939 – November 2, 2013) was a tight end with the Calgary Stampeders from 1964 to 1972.

College football
Herm Harrison played college football at Arizona State University.

Calgary
Herm Harrison came to the Calgary Stampeders in 1964 as a linebacker, but was converted to tight end . At that position, Harrison became a Western conference all-star 6 times (1965, 1967–1971) and CFL-All Star 3 times (1968, 1969, 1970). In 1968, he led the CFL with 1,306 yards receiving. In 1969 and 1970, Harrison led the Western conference in pass receptions with 68 and 70, respectively, and tied for the lead in 1971 with 70 catches.

Calgary won the 59th Grey Cup of 1971 over the Toronto Argonauts on a wet field. Harrison scored the only touchdown for the Stampeders that day, a 14-yard pass from Keeling in a 14–11 victory. The Stampeders also won the 1968 and 1970 Western Finals but lost the 56th Grey Cup to the Ottawa Rough Riders and the 58th Grey Cup to the Montreal Alouettes.

Post-football honors
For his pass catching and blocking abilities as one of the premier tight ends of his era, Harrison was inducted into the Canadian Football Hall of Fame in 1993 and his number (No. 76) retired as a member of Calgary.

References

External links
 Canadian Football Hall of Fame member
 

1942 births
2013 deaths
American players of Canadian football
Arizona State Sun Devils football players
Calgary Stampeders players
Canadian Football Hall of Fame inductees
Canadian football slotbacks
Players of Canadian football from Alberta
Canadian football people from Calgary